Diego Nahuel Sevillano (born February 24, 1991 in Mendoza, Argentina) is an Argentine footballer currently playing for Club Ciudad de Bolívar.

Career

Club career
In August 2019 it was confirmed, that Sevillano had moved to FADEP (Fundación Amigos por el Deporte). In February 2022, he moved to Club Ciudad de Bolívar.

References

External links
 
 
 
 
 

1991 births
Living people
Argentine footballers
Argentine expatriate footballers
ASC Oțelul Galați players
Godoy Cruz Antonio Tomba footballers
Unión San Felipe footballers
Deportes Quindío footballers
Liga I players
Argentine Primera División players
Primera B de Chile players
Categoría Primera B players
Expatriate footballers in Chile
Expatriate footballers in Romania
Expatriate footballers in Colombia
Argentine expatriate sportspeople in Chile
Argentine expatriate sportspeople in Romania
Argentine expatriate sportspeople in Colombia
Association football forwards
Sportspeople from Mendoza Province